Sangaré is a surname of Fula origin and may refer to:

 Abdoulahy Sangaré (born 1984), Mauritianian footballer
 Badra Ali Sangaré (born 1986), Ivorian footballer
 Djoumin Sangaré (born 1983), French footballer
 Drissa Sangaré (born 1987), Malian footballer
 Ibrahim Sangaré (born 1997), Ivorian footballer
 Justin Sangaré (born 1998), French Rugby League player
 Mamadi Sangare (born 1982), Guinean footballer
 Mamadou Blaise Sangaré (born 1954), Malian politician
 Nazim Sangaré (born 1994), Turkish footballer
 Omar Sangare (born 1970), Polish actor
 Oumou Sangaré (born 1968), Malian musician
 Sékou Sangaré (born 1974), Malian footballer
 Tiémoko Sangaré, Malian politician

Fula surnames